Mohsen Taheri is an Iranian former handball player and coach and a football administrator. He was the president and member of the director board of Sepahan F.C. club from 2016 until 2018.

Club achievements
He was player and captain of the Sepahan F.C. handball club between 1995 and 2004. He has 10 championships in Iran's Handball League and Knock-out Cup.

Other achievements
 second place in Asian Club League Handball Championship 2004 in Tehran.
 Third place with Zob Ahan Esfahan F.C. in Asian Club League Handball Championship in Jordan 1998.
 As an assistant coach, champion of Iranian Premier Handball League 2006, 2007 with Sepahan F.C. club.
 As a head coach of Sepahan F.C. club, 3rd place in Asian Club League Handball Championship in Kuwait 2007.
 Being the head coach in Azad University club, Naft Gachsaran, Parsian Tehran and Sepahan F.C. Handball club.
 As a player, he played in the Shahid Karimi Khoram Abad, Homa Tehran, Entezam Isfahan, Entezam Tehran, Shahrdari Arak and Sepahan F.C.

Iran men's national handball team achievement
 Iran men's national handball team player from 1985 to 2004.
 Eight years the captain of the Iran men's national handball team.
 Fourth place in Beach handball at the World Games, 2001, Akita, Japan.
 As an assistant coach, 3rd place in 2006 Asian Games.
 As a head coach, 5th place in Asian Men's Youth Handball Championship, Abu Dhabi, UAE, 2014.
 As a head coach, 4th place in Asian Men's Junior Handball Championship, Tabriz, Iran, 2014.
 As an assistant coach, 2nd place in Handball at the 2016 Summer Olympics – Men's qualification, Duha, Qatar, 2015.
 As an assistant coach, 5th place in Asian Men's Handball Championship, Manama, Bahrain, 2016.

Individual achievement
 All-star Team in Asia, Best Pivot, 2002.
 Best Pivot of Asian Club League Handball Championship 1999, 2001, and 2004.
 Holder of International Coaching Certification "Global Coaching"2011.

References

Living people
Sepahan S.C. managers
1968 births
Iranian male handball players
Handball players at the 1998 Asian Games
People from Khorramabad
Asian Games competitors for Iran
Iranian football managers